Felice Cignani (January 27, 1660 – January 12, 1724) was an Italian painter of the Baroque period, active mainly in Forlì and Bologna. He was a pupil and son of the painter Carlo Cignani. Felice helped train his cousin, Paolo Cignani (1709–1764).

Works
 San Tommaso d'Aquino (Saint Thomas Aquinas), Forlì, Pinacoteca Civica
 Autoritratto (Self-portrait), Forlì, Pinacoteca Civica
 With Carlo Cignani, La Vergine e San Filippo Neri (The Virgin and Saint Philip Neri), Forlì, Pinacoteca Civica.

References

1660 births
1724 deaths
17th-century Italian painters
Italian male painters
18th-century Italian painters
Painters from Bologna
Italian Baroque painters
18th-century Italian male artists